The Last Supper (1480) is a fresco depicting the Last Supper of Jesus by the Italian Renaissance artist Domenico Ghirlandaio; it is located in the refectory of the Convent of the Ognissanti on Borgo Ognissanti #42 in central Florence, region of Tuscany, Italy. It is one of three Last Supper frescoes painted by Ghirlandaio in Florence, the others being for the Badia di Passignano (1476) and for the Cenacolo di San Marco (1486).

History
The layout of the scene resembles that seen in the Andrea del Castagno's Last Supper frescoed some 3 to 4 decades earlier for the refectory of Sant'Apollonia in Florence, wherein the apostles sit in a shallow U-shaped setting, with only the two flanking apostles sitting at a 90-degree angle with the others. John the Apostle at Christ's left has fallen to sleep. Judas sits apart on the near side of the table, as is common in early depictions of the Last Supper in Christian art.  However, in this depiction, the upper register is not interior but opens up into the tree-line orchard with birds. The halos of the apostles have narrowed into thin circles; the apostles cast shadows. St Peter and another apostle appear to challenge Judas.

Ghirlandaio was well known when he received the commission for this fresco, and soon after its completion, he was called to Rome to help decorate the Sistine Chapel. It is likely that Leonardo da Vinci was familiar with this treatment of the subject, as well as that of Castagno, and painted his own Last Supper in a more dramatic form to contrast with the stillness of these works so that more emotion would be displayed.

During the restoration of this fresco, a preliminary sketch of it was discovered on the left wall of the refectory in Cenacolo di Ognissanti.

References

Sources
 Italian Wikipedia

Fresco paintings in Florence
Paintings by Domenico Ghirlandaio
Paintings in Florence
Ghirlandaio
Birds in art